The Robert Langdon book series is named after Robert Langdon, the protagonist of the novels by American author Dan Brown. Langdon is portrayed as a Harvard University professor of religious iconology and symbology, a fictional field related to the study of historic symbols, which is not methodologically connected to the actual discipline of semiotics. Brown's novels that feature the lead character also include historical themes and Christianity as motifs, and as a result have generated controversy. Brown states on his website that his books are not anti-Christian, and that he is on a "constant spiritual journey" himself.

Books of the series

Reception
The series has sold over 120 million copies.

Film and television adaptations

The novels were a success around the world and became bestsellers, and soon adapted into films in which Ron Howard directed and produced 3 of 5 novels: The Da Vinci Code (2006), Angels & Demons (2009), and Inferno (2016), with Tom Hanks portraying the lead character, Professor Robert Langdon. All three were released by Columbia Pictures.

The novel The Lost Symbol was adapted in 2021 by Peacock with Ashley Zukerman playing the lead character, Professor Robert Langdon. The series has 1 season containing 10 episodes. In January 2022, Peacock canceled the show after only 1 season, which will continue to be available for streaming.

See also
 Robert Langdon

References

External links
 The official Robert Langdon website
 Dan Brown Official Website

Book series introduced in 2000
Series of books
Novels by Dan Brown